The Manifesto of the 343, was a French petition signed by 343 women "who had the courage to say, 'I've had an abortion. It was an act of civil disobedience, since abortion was illegal in France, and by admitting publicly to having aborted, they exposed themselves to criminal prosecution. On 5 April 1971, in issue 334 of Le Nouvel Observateur, a social democratic French weekly magazine, the manifesto, "Un appel de 343 femmes" (an appeal by 343 women), was published, as the sole topic on the magazine cover. The manifesto called for the legalization of abortion and free access to contraception. It paved the way to the adoption, in December 1974 and January 1975, of the "Veil law", named for Health Minister Simone Veil, that repealed the penalty for voluntarily terminating a pregnancy during the first ten weeks (later extended to fourteen weeks).

The text
The text of the manifesto was written by Simone de Beauvoir. It began (and translated into English):

Response

The week after the manifesto appeared, the front page of the satirical weekly Charlie Hebdo carried a drawing attacking male politicians with the question "Qui a engrossé les 343 salopes du manifeste sur l'avortement?" ("Who got the 343 sluts from the abortion manifesto pregnant?"). This drawing by Cabu gave the manifesto its familiar nickname, often mistaken as the original title. For Maud Gelly, doctor and author, "A caricature meant at ridiculing politicians left a macho insult to qualify these women, and that tells a lot about the anti-feminism sometimes dominating the rewriting of the history of women's struggles."

In 1971, the feminist group Choisir ("To Choose") was founded by Gisèle Halimi, to protect the women who had signed the Manifesto. In 1972, Choisir formed itself into a clearly reformist body, and the campaign greatly influenced the passing of the law allowing contraception and legal abortion carried through by Simone Veil in 1974.

Notable signatories
 
 Françoise Arnoul
 Brigitte Auber
 Stéphane Audran
 Colette Audry
 Tina Aumont
 Hélène de Beauvoir
 Simone de Beauvoir
 Loleh Bellon
 Catherine Claude
 Iris Clert
 Geneviève Cluny
 Lila De Nobili
 Lise Deharme
 Christine Delphy
 Catherine Deneuve
 Dominique Desanti
 Marguerite Duras
 Françoise d'Eaubonne
 Arlette Elkaïm-Sartre
 Françoise Fabian
 Annie Fargue
 Brigitte Fontaine
 Antoinette Fouque
 Claude Génia
 Gisèle Halimi
 Catherine Joly
 Olga Kosakiewicz
 Bernadette Lafont
 Danièle Lebrun
 Violette Leduc
 Marceline Loridan-Ivens
 Françoise Lugagne
 Judith Magre
 Geneviève Mnich
 Ariane Mnouchkine

 Claudine Monteil
 Jeanne Moreau
 Michèle Moretti
 Liane Mozère
 Bulle Ogier
Marie Pillet (Julie Delpy's mother)
 Marie-France Pisier
 Micheline Presle
 Marthe Robert
 Christiane Rochefort
 Yvette Roudy

 Françoise Sagan
 Delphine Seyrig
 Alexandra Stewart
 Gaby Sylvia
 Nadine Trintignant
 Irène Tunc
 Agnès Varda
Ursula Vian-Kübler
 Marina Vlady
 Anne Wiazemsky
 Monique Wittig
 Anne Zelensky

Legacy

It was the inspiration for a February 3, 1973, manifesto by 331 French doctors declaring their support for abortion rights:

We want freedom of abortion. It is entirely the woman's decision. We reject any entity that forces her to defend herself, perpetuates an atmosphere of guilt, and allows underground abortions to persist ...

See also
:fr:Mouvement pour la liberté de l'avortement et de la contraception (MLAC)
We've had abortions! (1971)
You Know Me movement (2019)

Further reading 
 
 </ref>

References

External links 
 Charlie Hebdo. Rétrospective - Le manifeste des 343 salopes at YouTube

Feminism in France
Abortion in France
Political manifestos
1971 in politics
1971 in France
1971 documents
1971 in women's history